The 1967 Canadian Grand Prix was a Formula One motor race held at Mosport Park in Bowmanville, Ontario, Canada on August 27, 1967. The 90-lap contest was race 8 of 11 in both the 1967 World Championship of Drivers and the 1967 International Cup for Formula One Manufacturers. It was won by Jack Brabham driving for his own Brabham team. This was the first Canadian Grand Prix to have World Championship status.

Having already changed his battery on the grid, losing six laps, local driver Al Pease spun his private Eagle-Climax and stalled out on the circuit during the race, and suffered another flat battery. He ran back to the pits for a new one, ran back to the car, fitted the battery himself and continued. He was still running at the finish, albeit 43 laps down on Brabham.

Classification

Qualifying

Race

Championship standings after the race

Drivers' Championship standings

Constructors' Championship standings

 Notes: Only the top five positions are included for both sets of standings.

References

External links 

Photos from the 1967 Canadian Grand Prix at Mosport

Canadian Grand Prix
Canadian Grand Prix
1967 in Canadian motorsport